Mayanne Mak (born 1987) is a Canadian born Hong Kong television host and actress contracted to TVB.

Career

2011-2017: Miss Hong Kong Pageant and TV Host  
Mak participated in the 2011 Miss Hong Kong contest and eventually came fourth. After joining TVB, she mainly host television shows and public events. Mak rose to popularity with  Sidewalk Scientist, for which she has host since 2013. She occasionally guest starred in TV dramas as well. In 2015, Mak received attention with her role as Jessica Wong in the comedy drama Romantic Repertoire. She was one of the judges of the 2016 Miss Hong Kong contest.

2018-present: Breakthrough and gaining recognition 
In 2018, Mak won the Most Improved Female Artiste award at the 2017 TVB Anniversary Awards. She is the first recipient of this category who mainly appeared as a presenter. In 2020, Mak guest starred in the crime drama Line Walker: Bull Fight as the undercover agent Chu Sin, in which she garnered praise from netizens and earned her first nomination for the Best Supporting Actress award at the 2020 TVB Anniversary Awards. She was placed among the top 5 nominees for the same category with her role in the 2021 comedy drama AI Romantic.

Filmography

Television dramas
 This table shows the TV dramas from TVB Mayanne Mak starred.

Host

Anecdote 
People confused her with the champion of Miss Hong Kong Pageant 2015 Louisa Mak.

Awards and nominations

TVB Anniversary Awards

TVB Star Awards Malaysia

People’s Choice Television Awards

References 

1987 births
Living people
Canadian actresses of Chinese descent
Hong Kong actresses
Hong Kong television actresses
Hong Kong television presenters
Hong Kong women television presenters
TVB actors
University of British Columbia alumni
Canadian-born Hong Kong artists